The Men's team table tennis - Class 4-5 tournament at the 2012 Summer Paralympics in London took place from 5 September to 8 September 2012 at ExCeL Exhibition Centre. Classes 1-5 were for athletes with a physical impairment that affected their legs, and who competed in a sitting position. The lower the number, the greater the impact the impairment was on an athlete’s ability to compete.

Bracket

Results

First round

Quarter-finals

Semi-finals

Finals
Gold medal match

Bronze medal match

References

MT04-05